Wyatt Arnold "Watty" Lee (1879-1936) was a Major League Baseball outfielder and pitcher. He played all or part of four seasons in the majors, from  until , for the Washington Senators and Pittsburgh Pirates.

Lee broke into the major leagues with the ascension of the American League to major league status in 1901. Playing for the Senators, Lee won 16 games, second on the team to Case Patten's 18 wins. He also played 7 games in the outfield and batted .256.

In 1902, Lee was moved to the outfield full-time, playing 96 games there. He batted .256 again and set career highs in every other major statistical category. He hit all four of his career home runs this season. Lee also pitched in 13 games with a record of 5–7.

1903 saw Lee splitting his time more evenly between pitching and the outfield. Lee played 47 games in the outfield and 22 games as a pitcher. His batting average slipped to just .208, but he had a career-best ERA of 3.08 while posting a record of 8–12.

Lee jumped to the National League in 1904, playing for the defending NL champion Pirates. He appeared in just 8 games, 5 as a pitcher and 3 as a pinch hitter. Although he went 4-for-12 at the plate for a .333 batting average, his pitching record was not nearly as good, as he posted a bloated 8.74 ERA while winning 1 game and losing 2.

While this was the end of Lee's major league career, he went on to a long career in minor league baseball. He continued to split his time between pitching and the outfield until , when he became a pitcher only.

Lee died of cardiac disease on March 6, 1936, in Washington, D.C. He was interred at Mount Olivet Cemetery in Washington, D.C.

References

Sources

External links

Major League Baseball pitchers
Washington Senators (1901–1960) players
Pittsburgh Pirates players
Kansas City Blues (baseball) players
Montreal Royals players
Toronto Maple Leafs (International League) players
Toledo Mud Hens players
Altoona Mountaineers players
Williamsport Millionaires players
Harrisburg Senators players
Newark Indians players
Richmond Virginians (minor league) players
Baseball players from Virginia
1879 births
1936 deaths
People from Campbell County, Virginia
Burials at Mount Olivet Cemetery (Washington, D.C.)